The 1984 NCAA Indoor Track and Field Championships were contested March 9−10, 1984 at the Carrier Dome at Syracuse University in Syracuse, New York to determine the individual and team national champions of men's and women's NCAA collegiate indoor track and field events in the United States. These were the 20th annual men's championships and the 2nd annual women's championships.

On the men's side, Arkansas claimed the team title, the Razorbacks' first. This would ultimately be the first of twelve straight titles for Arkansas. For the women's title, Nebraska prevailed for the second straight year, the Cornhuskers' second title.

This was the first year the championship event was not held Michigan and the last combined event before the establishment of separate Division II and Division III titles in 1985.

Qualification
Unlike other NCAA-sponsored sports, there were not separate Division I, Division II, and Division III championships for indoor track and field until 1985. As such, all athletes and teams from University and College Division programs were eligible to compete.

Team standings 
 Note: Top 10 only
 Scoring: 6 points for a 1st-place finish in an event, 4 points for 2nd, 3 points for 3rd, 2 points for 4th, and 1 point for 5th
 (DC) = Defending Champions
 Full results

Men's title

Women's title

References

NCAA Indoor Track and Field Championships
Ncaa Indoor Track And Field Championships
Ncaa Indoor Track And Field Championships
NCAA Indoor Track and Field Championships